Cyathea is a subgenus in the genus Cyathea.

Classification
Subgenus Cyathea
Section Cyathea
Cyathea acutidens
Cyathea alata
Cyathea albomarginata
Cyathea alphonsiana
Cyathea alstonii
Cyathea amazonica
Cyathea andina
Cyathea arborea
Cyathea armata
Cyathea aspera
Cyathea atahuallpa
Cyathea aterrima
Cyathea atrovirens
Cyathea barringtonii
Cyathea × bernardii
Cyathea bettinae
Cyathea bicrenata
Cyathea bipinnata
Cyathea boliviana
Cyathea borbonica
Cyathea borinquena
Cyathea bradei
Cyathea brevistipes
Cyathea brunnescens
Cyathea × calolepis
Cyathea caracasana
Cyathea cicatricosa
Cyathea concordia
Cyathea conformis
Cyathea conjugata
Cyathea corallifera
Cyathea costaricensis
†Cyathea cranhamii
Cyathea cyatheoides
Cyathea cyclodium
Cyathea cystolepis
Cyathea darienensis
Cyathea decomposita
Cyathea decorata
Cyathea decurrens
Cyathea delgadii
Cyathea demissa
Cyathea dichromatolepis
Cyathea dissimilis
Cyathea dissoluta
Cyathea divergens
Cyathea dombeyi
Cyathea dudleyi
Cyathea ebenina
Cyathea estelae
Cyathea falcata
Cyathea frigida
Cyathea fulva
Cyathea furfuracea
Cyathea gardneri
Cyathea gibbosa
Cyathea glauca
Cyathea gracilis
Cyathea halonata
Cyathea harrisii
Cyathea haughtii
Cyathea hemiepiphytica
Cyathea hirsuta
Cyathea hodgeana
Cyathea holdridgeana
Cyathea howeana
Cyathea impar
Cyathea intramarginalis
Cyathea jamaicensis
Cyathea kalbreyeri
Cyathea lasiosora
Cyathea latevagens
Cyathea lechleri
Cyathea leucofolis
Cyathea × lewisii
Cyathea lockwoodiana
Cyathea macrocarpa
Cyathea macrosora
Cyathea marginalis
Cyathea microdonta
Cyathea microphylla
Cyathea microphylla
Cyathea mucilagina
Cyathea multiflora
Cyathea multisegmenta
Cyathea myosuroides
Cyathea nanna
Cyathea nesiotica
Cyathea nigripes
Cyathea nodulifera
Cyathea notabilis
Cyathea onusta
Cyathea palaciosii
Cyathea paladensis
Cyathea pallescens
Cyathea parianensis
Cyathea parva
Cyathea parvula
Cyathea pauciflora
Cyathea petiolata
Cyathea phalaenolepis
Cyathea phalerata
Cyathea phegopteroides
Cyathea pilosissima
Cyathea pinnula
Cyathea platylepis
Cyathea poeppigii
Cyathea praecincta
Cyathea pseudonanna
Cyathea pubens
Cyathea punctata
Cyathea pungens
Cyathea robertsiana
Cyathea rufa
Cyathea ruiziana
Cyathea sagittifolia
Cyathea schiedeana
Cyathea schlimii
Cyathea senilis
Cyathea simplex
Cyathea sipapoensis
Cyathea speciosa
Cyathea squamulosa
Cyathea steyermarkii
Cyathea stipularis
Cyathea stokesii
Cyathea stolzei
Cyathea straminea
Cyathea subtropica
Cyathea suprastrigosa
Cyathea surinamensis
Cyathea tenera
Cyathea tortuosa
Cyathea trichiata
Cyathea tryonorum
Cyathea ursina
Cyathea valdecrenata
Cyathea venezuelensis
Cyathea villosa
Cyathea weatherbyana
Cyathea wendlandii
Cyathea werffii
Cyathea williamsii

Notes

References
Braggins, John E. & Large, Mark F. 2004. Tree Ferns. Timber Press, Inc., p. 82. 

Cyatheaceae
Plant subgenera